The following is a timeline of the history of the city of Jerez de la Frontera, Spain.

Prior to 20th century

 1261 - Siege of Jerez by forces of Christian Alfonso X of Castile.
 1264 - Alfonso X in power.
 1457 - Church of San Dionisio built (approximate date).
 1484 - Church of San Miguel construction begins.
 1733 - Gremio de Vinatería de Jerez (guild of vintners) active.
 1786 - Real Sociedad Económica de Amigos del País de Jerez de la Frontera (learned society) established.
 1842 - Population: 33,104.
 1869 -  (aqueduct) begins operating.
 1873 -  (library) opens.
 1892 - 8 January: Jerez uprising peasant revolt
 1900 - Population: 63,473.

20th century

 1907 - Xerez FC (football club) formed.
 1928 -  (theatre) opens.
 1932 -  (stadium) opens.
 1939 - Sociedad de Estudios Históricos Jerezanos (historical society) incorporated.
 1945 -  (cemetery) established.
 1947 - Xerez CD (football club) formed.
 1950 - Population: 107,770.
 1957 - Cine Lealas (cinema) established.
 1964 - Cine Delicias (cinema) established.
 1970 - Population: 149,867.
 1976 -  formed.
 1980 - Roman Catholic Diocese of Jerez de la Frontera established.
 1984 -  newspaper begins publication.
1985 - Circuito de Jerez motorsport circuit opens.
 1988 - Estadio Municipal de Chapín (stadium) opens.
 1989 -  begins broadcasting.

21st century

 2001 - Population: 183,273.
 2003 -  becomes mayor.
 2011 - Population: 211,784.
 2015 -  becomes mayor.

See also
 Jerez de la Frontera history
 Timelines of other cities in the autonomous community of Andalusia: Almería, Cádiz, Córdoba, Granada, Jaén, Málaga, Seville
 List of municipalities in Andalusia

References

This article incorporates information from the Spanish Wikipedia.

Bibliography

in English

in Spanish

External links
  (city archives)

Jerez de la Frontera
Jerez de la Frontera